The Anthem World Tour is the twelfth concert tour by American pop-rock band, Hanson and is in support of their sixth studio album, Anthem (2013). The tour began in the summer of 2013, playing nearly 80 shows in the Americas, Europe and Australasia.

Opening acts
Paul McDonald 
David Ryan Harris 
Sion Russell Jones 
Adam Martin 
Jamie McDell

Setlist
The following setlist was obtained from the concert held on July 21, 2013, at the Credicard Hall in São Paulo, Brazil. It does not represent all concerts for the duration of the tour.
"Fired Up"
"You Can't Stop Us"
"I've Got Soul"
"Where's the Love"
"Thinking of You"
"Scream and Be Free"
"A Minute Without You"
"Weird"
"Crazy Beautiful"
"Lost Without You" / "Deeper" / "Save Me from Myself" / "Juliet"
"Waiting for This"
"Already Home"
"Thinking 'bout Somethin'"
"Penny & Me"
"Give a Little"
"Get the Girl Back"
"MMMBop"
"This Time Around"
"Tonight"
Encore
"Save Me"
"You Can't Stop Us Now"
"In the City"

Tour dates

Festivals and other miscellaneous performances
This concert was a part of the "Minnesota State Fair"
This concert was a part of "Nitefall on the River"
This concert was a part of the "Western Fair"
This concert was a part of the "Eat to the Beat Concert Series"

Box office score date

References

2013 concert tours
2014 concert tours
Hanson (band)